The first season of Junior Masterchef Vietnam has been launched to search for budding kid chefs in the country. Children aged between 8 and 14 can now register to attend the cooking competition at www.vuadaubepnhi.vtv.vn until September 5.

Seasons

Season 1

References

Vietnam
Television series about children
Television series about teenagers